is a Japanese anime series produced by Konami Digital Entertainment Co., Ltd., based on Konami's popular Tokimeki Memorial dating simulation series, specifically Tokimeki Memorial Online. It premiered October 3, 2006 across Japan on TV Tokyo. The anime series ended its run on March 27, 2007 with 25 episodes. The DVD release includes an additional episode (occurring between episodes 17 and 18) and a special compilation episode for a total of 27 episodes.

Plot
The anime main line story revolves around a second year high school student, Riku Aoba, who has just recently transferred to Holy Cross High School, where he notices, upon joining, several unique and funny occurrences, often being the target of a series of events and races administered by the student council and its fun-seeking president.

While at the academy, Riku meets the original Tokimeki Memorial Online characters and the story begins.

Characters
 
 
 A second-year student at class 2-A and Sayuri's classmate. Before transferring to Tsugumi, Riku used to live in a snowy harbour in the northeast of Hokkaido. He is often a target of a series of bizarre events and races administered by the school council. Tsukasa, Sayuri, and Mina compete for his affections.
 
 
 A second-year student at class 2-A. Graceful and intelligent, Sayuri is an extremely popular girl at school, and is talented in academics and sports (and surprisingly video games), often being the subject of admiration from several of the school's male students. Numerous legends have been told of the greatness of her actions in the past year. She falls deeply in love with Riku after noticing he treats her like he treats everyone and she can be herself around him, though she has been hiding her true feelings from everyone's knowledge, including Riku's.
 
 
 A second-year student at class 2-B, Tsukasa is a highly skilled member of the school's volleyball team. She is a believer in destiny, and falls in love with Riku almost immediately after bumping into him one day, declaring that Aoba is her boyfriend from that point on. She is also a bad cook. She successfully changes this by learning from the home economics teacher. However she skips several of the classes afterwards and her cooking becomes terrible again.
 
 
 A first-year student at class 1-C, Mina is a member of the school's swimming team. She loves dolphins and is quite shy. She appeared first in the school library, Aoba helped her reach a book about dolphins. After Aoba agrees to become her coach, she falls in love with him. She is very nervous to confess her true feelings to him. Also because of her love of the sea life she quite reluctant to prepare food from the sea.
 
 
 The school council president, who is often engaged in arranging several strange and bizarre events, often involving Riku as the target. He appears to be much lazier or less responsible than expected as he tried to avoid work concerning the Cultural Festival and asked Riku to take part with helping in the Festival (This was possibly to lessen his own work load).
 
 
 Sits next to Riku in class. He appears to be cold and distant from his other classmates even to his teachers, but is far kinder and warmer than he appears. His hobbies include painting and caring for small animals. Riku and him become good friends, which the latter won't actually admit but subtly. When hearing the news that Riku will transfer to another school on the day of the closing ceremony, Inukai is shocked about that.

Episodes

Theme songs

Opening theme

Lyricist: Chihiro Kurosu
Composition: Takuya Watanabe
Arrangement: m-takeshi
Performance: Yuki Makishima

Ending themes

Lyricist: Akiko Watanabe
Composition: Kazuya Komatsu
Arrangement: Ryosuke Nakanishi
Performance: Yuki Makishima, Yukako Yoshikawa and Saki Fujita

Lyricist: Chihiro Kurosu
Composition: Takeshi Uehara
Arrangement: Hiroshi Matsui
Performance: Yuki Makishima, Yukako Yoshikawa and Saki Fujita

References

External links
Tokimeki Memorial Only Love at Konami
Tokimeki Memorial Only Love at TV Tokyo

Anime television series based on video games
Anime International Company
Dengeki Comic Gao!
Konami
School life in anime and manga
Tokimeki Memorial
Works based on Konami video games